
Year 426 BC was a year of the pre-Julian Roman calendar. At the time, it was known as the Year of the Tribunate of Cincinnatus, Albinus, Fusus and Cossus (or, less frequently, year 328 Ab urbe condita). The denomination 426 BC for this year has been used since the early medieval period, when the Anno Domini calendar era became the prevalent method in Europe for naming years.

Events 
 By place 
 Greece 
 The Athenian leader Cleon and Athenian general Demosthenes revitalise the city's military and naval forces despite opposition from Nicias, a rich merchant and soldier, and his supporters.
 Demosthenes unsuccessfully besieges the Corinthian colony of Leukas. As a result, he does not return to Athens, fearing for his life. However when, later in the year, Ambracia invades Acarnania, and the Acarnanians seek help from Demosthenes, who is patrolling the Ionian Sea coast with twenty Athenian ships, he reaches the Athenian naval base in the Gulf of Corinth at Naupactus and secures it just in time to defend it against a large Spartan army from Delphi under Eurylochus which has come to assist the Ambraciots. Demosthenes defeats the Spartan army and Eurylochus is killed during the Battle of Olpae. The Acarnanians and Ambraciots then sign a peace treaty.
 An Athenian army under Nicias, Hipponicus and Eurymedon defeats a combined Tanagran and Theban army in the Battle of Tanagra.

Births

Deaths 
 Eurylochus, Spartan general (killed in battle)
 Zhou kao wang, King of the Zhou Dynasty of China

References